Interstate 440 (I-440) and Highway 440 (AR 440), in the central part of the US state of Arkansas, form a partial loop of  connecting U.S. Highway 67 (US 67), US 167, and I-40 with I-30 and I-530 near Little Rock. I-440, known as the East Belt Freeway during planning and construction, travels through much of the area's industrial core in the eastern part of the metropolitan area, near Clinton National Airport and the Port of Little Rock. The route is mostly a six-lane freeway. North of  the route continues as AR 440 until it reaches US 67/US 167 (Future I-57) in Jacksonville. This section is known as the North Belt Freeway.

Route description
I-440 begins at I-30 at a large interchange with I-530. After this interchange, I-440 intersects AR 365 (Springer Boulevard) and Bankhead Drive near Clinton National Airport (formerly Little Rock National Airport). The highway continues across Lindsey Road northeast to cross the Arkansas River. I-440 has interchanges with US 165 and US 70 before terminating at I-40. On the northside of  I-440 transitions to AR 440, an extension of I-440 built to Interstate standards. AR 440 runs northeast to Jacksonville, connecting North Little Rock's easternmost neighborhoods with US 67/US 167 (Future I-57). There are ghost ramps at the terminus. AR 440 may be redesignated as I-440 when I-57 is designated along US 67.

To avoid repeating the disturbance of the Fourche Creek floodplain by a causeway section of I-30 (including what is now the I-30/I-440/I-530 interchange), most of I-440 between I-30 and the exit leading to the airport is an extended bridge through the floodplain, crossing Fourche Creek several times.

History
The idea of I-440 was first proposed in 1941.

I-440 is part of a planned full loop around the metropolitan area, together with I-430. Part of that effort, an extended route from I-440's east end at I-40 to US 67/US 167, opened in 2003 as AR 440 and is also part of the North Belt Freeway project. However, completing the North Belt Freeway to I-430 has been put on hold after its cost was estimated at over $600 million.

Exit list

References

40-4 Arkansas
40-4
440 Arkansas
State highways in Arkansas
Transportation in Pulaski County, Arkansas